The Best of Rod Stewart is a compilation album by British singer-songwriter Rod Stewart, released on the Warner Bros. record label in 1989. The album features many of Stewart's biggest solo hit singles, from 1971's "Maggie May" to "Downtown Train", which was released as a single in 1989. This album was released in the UK and other countries, but was not released in the US.

Track listing 

Note
 Tracks 2, 5, 11 & 13 were not included on the vinyl issue and were added as 'bonus tracks' on the CD and cassette editions of the album.

Charts

Weekly charts

Year-end charts

Certifications

References 

1989 greatest hits albums
Warner Records compilation albums
Rod Stewart compilation albums